The system of Hebrew numerals is a quasi-decimal alphabetic numeral system using the letters of the Hebrew alphabet.
The system was adapted from that of the Greek numerals in the late 2nd century BCE.

The current numeral system is also known as the Hebrew alphabetic numerals to contrast with earlier systems of writing numerals used in classical antiquity. These systems were inherited from usage in the Aramaic and Phoenician scripts, attested from c. 800 BCE in the so-called Samaria ostraca and sometimes known as Hebrew-Aramaic numerals, ultimately derived from the Egyptian Hieratic numerals.

The Greek system was adopted in Hellenistic Judaism and had been in use in Greece since about the 5th century BCE.

In this system, there is no notation for zero, and the numeric values for individual letters are added together.  Each unit (1, 2, ..., 9) is assigned a separate letter, each tens (10, 20, ..., 90) a separate letter, and the first four hundreds (100, 200, 300, 400) a separate letter. The later hundreds (500, 600, 700, 800 and 900) are represented by the sum of two or three letters representing the first four hundreds. To represent numbers from 1,000 to 999,999, the same letters are reused to serve as thousands, tens of thousands, and hundreds of thousands. Gematria (Jewish numerology) uses these transformations extensively.

In Israel today, the decimal system of Hindu–Arabic numeral system (ex. 0, 1, 2, 3, etc.) is used in almost all cases (money, age, date on the civil calendar).  The Hebrew numerals are used only in special cases, such as when using the Hebrew calendar, or numbering a list (similar to a, b, c, d, etc.), much as Roman numerals are used in the West.

Numbers
The Hebrew language has names for common numbers that range from zero to one million. Letters of the Hebrew alphabet are used to represent numbers in a few traditional contexts, such as in calendars. In other situations, numerals from the Hindu–Arabic numeral system are used. Cardinal and ordinal numbers must agree in gender with the noun they are describing. If there is no such noun (e.g., in telephone numbers), the feminine form is used. For ordinal numbers greater than ten, the cardinal is used. Multiples of ten above the value 20 have no gender (20, 30, 40, ... are genderless), unless the number has the digit 1 in the tens position (110, 210, 310, ...).

Ordinal values

Note: For ordinal numbers greater than 10, cardinal numbers are used instead.

Cardinal values

Note: Officially, numbers greater than a million were represented by the long scale. However, since January 21, 2013, the modified short scale (under which the long scale milliard is substituted for the strict short scale billion), which was already the colloquial standard, became official.

Collective numerals

Speaking and writing
Cardinal and ordinal numbers must agree in gender (masculine or feminine; mixed groups are treated as masculine) with the noun they are describing. If there is no such noun (e.g. a telephone number or a house number in a street address), the feminine form is used. Ordinal numbers must also agree in number and definite status like other adjectives. The cardinal number precedes the noun (e.g., shlosha yeladim), except for the number one which succeeds it (e.g., yeled echad). The number two is special: shnayim (m.) and shtayim (f.) become shney (m.) and shtey (f.) when followed by the noun they count. For ordinal numbers (numbers indicating position) greater than ten the cardinal is used.

Calculations
The Hebrew numeric system operates on the additive principle in which the numeric values of the letters are added together to form the total.

Mathematically, this type of system requires 27 letters (1-9, 10–90, 100–900). In practice, the last letter, tav (which has the value 400), is used in combination with itself or other letters from qof (100) onwards to generate numbers from 500 and above. Alternatively, the 22-letter Hebrew numeral set is sometimes extended to 27 by using 5 sofit (final) forms of the Hebrew letters.

Key exceptions
In the calendar, this manifests every full moon since all Hebrew months start on a new moon (see for example: Tu BiShvat).

Combinations which would spell out words with negative connotations are sometimes avoided by switching the order of the letters.

Use of final letters
The Hebrew numeral system has sometimes been extended to include the five final letter forms— for 500,  for 600,  for 700,  for 800,  for 900.

Gershayim

Gershayim (U+05F4 in Unicode, and resembling a double quote mark) (sometimes erroneously referred to as merkha'ot, which is Hebrew for double quote) are inserted before (to the right of) the last (leftmost) letter to indicate that the sequence of letters represents something other than a word.  This is used in the case where a number is represented by two or more Hebrew numerals (e.g., 28 → ).

Similarly, a single geresh (U+05F3 in Unicode, and resembling a single quote mark) is appended after (to the left of) a single letter to indicate that the letter represents a number rather than a (one-letter) word.  This is used in the case where a number is represented by a single Hebrew numeral (e.g. 100 → ).

Note that geresh and gershayim merely indicate "not a (normal) word." Context usually determines whether they indicate a number or something else (such as an abbreviation).

An alternative method found in old manuscripts and still found on modern-day tombstones is to put a dot above each letter of the number.

Decimals
In print, Arabic numerals are employed in Modern Hebrew for most purposes.  Hebrew numerals are used nowadays primarily for writing the days and years of the Hebrew calendar; for references to traditional Jewish texts (particularly for Biblical chapter and verse and for Talmudic folios); for bulleted or numbered lists (similar to A, B, C, etc., in English); and in numerology (gematria).

Thousands and date formats
Thousands are counted separately, and the thousands count precedes the rest of the number (to the right, since Hebrew is read from right to left).  There are no special marks to signify that the "count" is starting over with thousands, which can theoretically lead to ambiguity, although a single quote mark is sometimes used after the letter.  When specifying years of the Hebrew calendar in the present millennium, writers usually omit the thousands (which is presently 5 []), but if they do not this is accepted to mean 5,000, with no ambiguity. The current Israeli coinage includes the thousands.

Date examples

"Monday, 15 Adar 5764" (where 5764 = 5(×1000) + 400 + 300 + 60 + 4, and 15 = 9 + 6):

 In full (with thousands): "Monday, 15(th) of Adar, 5764"
 

 Common usage (omitting thousands): "Monday, 15(th) of Adar, (5)764"
 

"Thursday, 3 Nisan 5767" (where 5767 = 5(×1000) + 400 + 300 + 60 + 7):

 In full (with thousands): "Thursday, 3(rd) of Nisan, 5767"
 

 Common usage (omitting thousands): "Thursday, 3(rd) of Nisan, (5)767"
 

To see how today's date in the Hebrew calendar is written, see, for example, Hebcal date converter.

Recent years
5781 (2020–21) = 

5780 (2019–20) = 

5779 (2018–19) = 

...

5772 (2011–12) = 

5771 (2010–11) = 

5770 (2009–10) = 

5769 (2008–09) = 

...

5761 (2000–01) = 

5760 (1999–2000) =

Similar systems

The Abjad numerals are equivalent to the Hebrew numerals up to 400. The Greek numerals differ from the Hebrew ones from 90 upwards because in the Greek alphabet there is no equivalent for tsade.

See also
 Bible code, a purported set of secret messages encoded within the Torah.
 Biblical and Talmudic units of measurement
 Chol HaMoed, the intermediate days during Passover and Sukkot.
 Chronology of the Bible
 Counting of the Omer
 Gematria, Jewish system of assigning numerical value to a word or phrase.
 Hebrew calendar
 Jewish and Israeli holidays 2000–2050
 Lag BaOmer, 33rd day of counting the Omer.
 Notarikon, a method of deriving a word by using each of its initial letters.
 Sephirot, the 10 attributes/emanations found in Kabbalah.
 Significance of numbers in Judaism
 Weekly Torah portion, division of the Torah into 54 portions.
 Base 32, a system that can be written with both all Arabic numerals and all Hebrew letters, much as how Base 36 is written with all Arabic numerals and roman letters.

References

External links

 Gematria Chart on inner.org
 Hebrew Number Chart 1 to 1 Million with English Transliteration
 Learn to say any number in English with Transliteration

Numerals
Numerals
Numerals